In enzymology, a glycine dehydrogenase (cytochrome) is an enzyme that catalyzes the chemical reaction

glycine + H2O + 2 ferricytochrome c  glyoxylate + NH3 + 2 ferrocytochrome c + 2 H+

The 3 substrates of this enzyme are glycine, H2O, and ferricytochrome c, whereas its 4 products are glyoxylate, NH3, ferrocytochrome c, and H+.

This enzyme belongs to the family of oxidoreductases, specifically those acting on the CH-NH2 group of donors with a cytochrome as acceptor.  The systematic name of this enzyme class is glycine:ferricytochrome-c oxidoreductase (deaminating). This enzyme is also called glycine---cytochrome c reductase.  This enzyme participates in glycine, serine and threonine metabolism.

References

 

EC 1.4.2
Enzymes of unknown structure